Cutshaw is a surname. People with that name include:

 George Cutshaw (1887–1973), MLB player
 Kenneth Cutshaw (active from 1982), American lawyer, diplomat, professor, business executive and entrepreneur
 Wilfred Emory Cutshaw (1838–1907), colonel in the Confederate Army and city engineer for Richmond, Virginia

See also